Québec (formerly known as Langelier) is a federal electoral district that has been represented in the House of Commons of Canada since 1968. It is located in Quebec City in the province of Quebec, Canada.

The main employer in the district is the provincial Government of Quebec.

Geography
The riding, in the Quebec region of Capitale-Nationale, consists of the central part of Quebec City, including the borough of La Cité and the southern part of the borough of Les Rivières, as well as the parish municipality of Notre-Dame-des-Anges.

The neighbouring ridings are Louis-Hébert, Louis-Saint-Laurent, Charlesbourg—Haute-Saint-Charles, Beauport—Limoilou, and Bellechasse—Les Etchemins—Lévis.

The riding gained a small fraction of territory from Louis-Hébert as a result of the 2012 electoral redistribution.

Demographics
According to the Canada 2011 Census

Ethnic groups: 91.4% White, 3.2% Indigenous, 1.6% Latino, 1.5% Black, 2.3% Other
Languages: 92.7% French, 1.9% English, 1.6% Spanish, 3.8% Other
Religions: 79.6% Christian, 1.4% Muslim, 0.8% Other, 18.2% None
Median income: $28,603 (2010) 
Average income: $35,961 (2010)

History

This riding was created as "Langelier" riding in 1966 from parts of Quebec East, Quebec South and Quebec West ridings. It was renamed "Québec" in 1990. Since its inception, this riding has always been represented by the party with the most support in Quebec.

Former boundaries

Riding associations 
Riding associations are the local branches of political parties:

Members of Parliament

Election results

Québec, 1993–present

Langelier, 1968–1993

	

							

					

Note: Mr. Papayre's result as a Marxist–Leninist candidate is compared to his result in the 1972 general election as an independent candidate.	

Note: Social Credit vote is compared to Ralliement créditiste vote in the 1968 election.

See also
 List of Canadian federal electoral districts
 Past Canadian electoral districts

References

Campaign expense data from Elections Canada
2011 Results from Elections Canada
Website of the Parliament of Canada

Notes

Quebec federal electoral districts
Federal electoral districts of Quebec City